Ralph Remick Comstock (November 24, 1887 – September 13, 1966) was a pitcher in Major League Baseball who played between 1913 and 1918 for the Detroit Tigers (1913), Boston Red Sox (1915), Pittsburgh Rebels (FL, 1915) and Pittsburgh Pirates (1918). Comstock batted and threw right-handed. He was born in Sylvania, Ohio, USA.

In a three-season career, Comstock posted an 11–14 record with 100 strikeouts and a 3.72 ERA in 40 games, including 22 starts, 10 complete games, four saves, and 203 innings pitched.

Comstock died in Toledo, Ohio, at the age of 78.

Sources

Retrosheet

1887 births
1966 deaths
Boston Red Sox players
Detroit Tigers players
Pittsburgh Pirates players
Pittsburgh Rebels players
Major League Baseball pitchers
Baseball players from Michigan
Oklahoma City Indians players
Austin Senators players
Minneapolis Millers (baseball) players
Fargo-Moorhead Graingrowers players
Providence Grays (minor league) players
Birmingham Barons players
Louisville Colonels (minor league) players
Shelbyville Grays players